Fawzi Al-Kharafi (born 1944/1945 – died 13 December 2021) was a Kuwaiti billionaire businessman.

Biography
He was the CEO and vice chairman of the M. A. Kharafi & Sons. He was the son of Mohammed Abdul Mohsen Al-Kharafi, the founder of M. A. Kharafi & Sons. In March 2018, Forbes estimated his net worth at US$1.2 billion. He married and lived in Kuwait City, Kuwait.

Al-Kharafi died on 13 December 2021 at the age of 76. He was buried at the Sulaibikhat Cemetery.

References

1940s births
2021 deaths
21st-century Kuwaiti businesspeople
Kuwaiti billionaires
Kuwaiti businesspeople